Bolsheukovsky District is an administrative and municipal district (raion), one of the thirty-two in Omsk Oblast, Russia. It is located in the northwest of the oblast. Its administrative center is the rural locality (a selo) of Bolshiye Uki. Population: 8,174 (2010 Census);  The population of Bolshiye Uki accounts for 50.9% of the district's total population.

References

Notes

Sources

Districts of Omsk Oblast